Maksim Nikolayevich Klikin (born 30 April 1981) is a former Russian professional football player.

Club career
He made his Russian Football National League debut for FC Arsenal Tula on 28 March 2004 in a game against FC Metallurg Lipetsk.

External links
 Player page by sportbox.ru
 

1981 births
Footballers from Moscow
Living people
Russian footballers
FC Dynamo Moscow reserves players
FC Metallurg Lipetsk players
FC Fakel Voronezh players
FC Mostransgaz Gazoprovod players
FC Arsenal Tula players
FC Zvezda Irkutsk players
Association football goalkeepers
FC Moscow players
FC Salyut Belgorod players
FC Novokuznetsk players
FC MVD Rossii Moscow players
FC Spartak Nizhny Novgorod players